This is a list of populated places in Mauritius and Agaléga.

Mauritius

Agaléga

See also

 Outer islands of Mauritius
 Districts of Mauritius
 Geography of Mauritius
 ISO 3166-2:MU

References 

ge

 
Mauritius geography-related lists
Mauritius
Mauritius